Brian Jaya Siva (born 29 January 1972) is a Malaysian field hockey player. He competed at the 1992 Summer Olympics and the 1996 Summer Olympics.

References

External links
 

1972 births
Living people
Malaysian people of Tamil descent
Malaysian sportspeople of Indian descent
Malaysian male field hockey players
Olympic field hockey players of Malaysia
Field hockey players at the 1992 Summer Olympics
Field hockey players at the 1996 Summer Olympics
Place of birth missing (living people)
1998 Men's Hockey World Cup players